Langangen is a village in Porsgrunn municipality, Telemark county, in Norway. Langangen borders to Larvik municipality and Vestfold county. Its population is 499 (2009 Census).

Langangen was earlier divided by European route E18 but in 1979 the road was led over Langangen bridge.

Langangen has its own elementary school and chapel.

References

External links

Villages in Vestfold og Telemark
Populated places in Porsgrunn